The following is a list of American films released in 1953.

Donald O'Connor and Fredric March cohosted the 26th Academy Awards ceremony on March 25, 1954, held at the RKO Pantages Theatre in Hollywood. This was the second year in which the ceremony was telecast, with viewership at an estimated 43,000,000.

The winner in the Best Motion Picture category was Columbia's From Here to Eternity. All of the major-category winners were black-and-white films.

The 11th Golden Globe Awards also honored the best films of 1953. There was no award for Best Picture in either the Musical or Comedy categories.

Spencer Tracy won the Golden Globe for Best Actor in a drama film for The Actress, while David Niven won Best Actor in the Musical or Comedy genre for The Moon Is Blue. Audrey Hepburn won Best Actress for Roman Holiday, and Ethel Merman won for Best Actress in a Musical or Comedy film for her role in Call Me Madam. The Robe won the Golden Globe for Best Motion Picture.

A-B

C

D-G

H-K

L-N

O-S

T-Z

Documentaries

Serials

Shorts

See also
 1953 in the United States

References

External links

1953 films at the Internet Movie Database

1953
Lists of 1953 films by country or language
Films